Cantonment is a town in Escambia County, Florida. It is a suburb of Pensacola, and is located in the Pensacola metropolitan Area. Cantonment is located north of Gonzalez, and south of Molino. It is centered around U.S. Route 29, and extends to the Perdido River to the west, and the Escambia River to the east.

History

In 1814 Andrew Jackson camped his troops in what is now the Cantonment area. This is also how the town received its name; as a cantonment is a temporary quarter for troops. Over the years, however, the pronunciation of the town's name has changed to differ from the pronunciation of the word cantonment. Locals generally refer to the town as "can-tone-ment."

Location

Cantonment is located in Escambia County, in the Pensacola-Ferry Pass-Brent, Florida Metropolitan Statistical Area, along US 29 north of Gonzalez. It is located in the Central Standard Time Zone.

Notable people
Loucheiz Purifoy, current Canadian Football League and former National Football League cornerback
Graham Gano, National Football League kicker
Fred Robbins, National Football League defensive lineman
Don Sutton, Major League Baseball Pitcher
Jay Bell, Major League Baseball Shortstop
Travis Fryman, Major League Baseball Shortstop, Third Base, Manager
Derek and Alex King, American murderers

References

Populated places in Escambia County, Florida
Former census-designated places in Escambia County, Florida
Former census-designated places in Florida